Codex Petropolitanus Purpureus, designated by N or 022 (in the Gregory-Aland numbering), ε 19 (Soden), is a Greek New Testament codex containing the four Gospels. It has been paleographically dated to the 6th century.

Codex Petropolitanus Purpureus, along with the manuscripts Φ, O, and Σ, belongs to the group of the Purple Uncials. The manuscript is very lacunose.

Description 
The codex is made of 231 parchment leaves (32 x 27 cm), with the text written in two columns, 16 lines per page, 12 letters in line, in large uncial letters. The lettering is in silver ink on vellum dyed purple, with gold ink used for the nomina sacra (and ). It has errors of iotacisms, as the change of ι and ει, αι and ε. It has been calculated the original codex contained 462 leaves.

The tables of κεφάλαια (tables of contents) were placed before each Gospel. The text is divided according to the κεφάλαια (chapters), whose numbers are given at the margin, with τίτλοι (titles of chapters) at the top of the pages. The Ammonian sections and the Eusebian Canons are presented in the margin.

Lacunae 
Gospel of Matthew 
1:1-24, 2:7-20, 3:4-6:24, 7:15-8:1, 8:24-31, 10:28-11:3, 12:40-13:4, 13:33-41, 14:6-22, 15:14-31, 16:7-18:5, 18:26-19:6, 19:13-20:6, 21:19-26:57, 26:65-27:26, 27:34-end;

Gospel of Mark 
1:1-5:20. 7:4-20, 8:32-9:1, 10:43-11:7, 12:19-14:25, 15:23-33, 15:42-16:20;

Gospel of Luke 
1:1-2:23, 4:3-19, 4:26-35, 4:42-5:12, 5:33-9:7, 9:21-28, 9:36-58, 10:4-12, 10:35-11:14, 11:23-12:12, 12:21-29, 18:32-19:17, 20:30-21:22, 22:49-57, 23:41-24:13, 24:21-39, 24:49-end;

Gospel of John 
1:1-21, 1:39-2:6, 3:30-4:5, 5:3-10, 5:19-26, 6:49-57, 9:33-14:2, 14:11-15:14, 15:22-16:15, 20:23-25, 20:28-30, 21:20-end.

Text 
The text of the codex is a representative of the Byzantine text-type, with numerous pre-Byzantine readings. According to Scrivener "it exhibits strong Alexandrian forms."
According to Streeter, in parts it has some Caesarean readings. Aland placed it in Category V, and it is certain that it is more Byzantine than anything else.

The texts of Luke 22:43-44, and John 7:53–8:11 are omitted.

In John 1:27 it has the addition  (He shall baptise you with the Holy Spirit and fire).

History 

It is understood that the manuscript originated in the imperial scriptorium of Constantinople and was dismembered by crusaders in the 12th century. In 1896 Nicholas II of Russia commissioned Fyodor Uspensky's Russian Archaeological Institute of Constantinople to buy the greater part of it for the Imperial Public Library in St. Petersburg.

The codex was examined by Lambeck, Montfaucon, Hermann Treschow, Alter, Hartel, Wickholf, Bianchini, H.S. Cronin, and Duchesne.

Wettstein in 1715 examined 4 leaves housed at London (Cotton Titus C. XV) and marked them by I. Wettstein cited only 5 of its readings. According to Scrivener it has 57 various readings.
Bianchini described portions housed at the Vatican Library. The same portions examined and collated for Scholz Gaetano Luigi Marini.

Vienna fragments, Codex Vindobonensis, were examined by Wettstein, who marked them by siglum N. Treschow in 1773 and Alter in 1787 had given imperfect collations of Vienna fragments. Peter Lambeck gave the wrong suggestion that Vienna fragments and Vienna Genesis originally belonged to the same codex.

Tischendorf published fragments of this manuscript in 1846 in his Monumenta sacra et profana. Tischendorf considered it as a fragment of the same codex as 6 leaves from Vatican, and 2 leaves from Vienna.

Louis Duchesne described the Patmos portions (1876). Athens and New York portions were edited by Stanley Rypins in 1956.

A facsimile of all fragments was published 2002 in Athens.

Present location 
The 231 extant folios of the manuscript are kept in different libraries: 
 182 leaves in the National Library of Russia in Saint Petersburg,
 33 leaves in the Library of the Monastery of Saint John the Theologian on the Island of Patmos, Greece, Mark 6:53-7:4; 7:20-8:32; 9:1-10:43; 11:7-12:19; 14:25-15:23;
 6 leaves in the Vatican Library in Vatican, Matthew 19:6-13; 20:6-22; 20:29-21:19
 4 leaves in London, British Library, Cotton Titus C. XV; Matthew 26:57-65; 27:26-34; John 14:2-10; 15:15-22; they were named the Codex Cottonianus;
 2 leaves in the National Library of Austria in Vienna,
 1 leaf in the Morgan Library in New York,
 1 leaf in the Byzantine Museum in Athens,
 1 leaf in the Museum of Byzantine Culture in Thessaloniki
 1 leaf in the private collection of Marquis А. Spinola in Lerma (1), Italy.

See also 

 List of New Testament uncials
 Textual criticism
 Purple parchment
 Uncial 087

References

Further reading 
 Constantin von Tischendorf, „Monumenta sacra inedita“, Leipzig, 1846, pp. 15–24.
 S. P. Tregelles, "An Introduction to the Critical study and Knowledge of the Holy Scriptures", London 1856, pp. 177–178.
 F. H. A. Scrivener, A Full and Exact Collation of About 20 Greek Manuscripts of the Holy Gospels, Cambridge and London, 1852, p. XL. (as j)
 Louis Duchesne, Archives des missions scientifiques et littéraires, Paris, 1876, vol. 3, pp. 386–419.
 H. S. Cronin, "Codex Purpureus Petropolitanus. The text of Codex N of the gospels edited with an introduction and an appendix", T & S, vol. 5, no. 4, Cambridge, 1899.
 C. R. Gregory, "Textkritik des Neuen Testaments", Leipzig, 1900, vol. 1, pp. 56–59.
 S. Rypins, Two Inedited Leaves of Codex N, JBL Vol. 75, No. 1 (Mar. 1956), pp. 27–39.
 Weitzmann, Kurt, ed., Age of spirituality : late antique and early Christian art, third to seventh century, no. 444, 1979, Metropolitan Museum of Art, New York, ; full text available online from The Metropolitan Museum of Art Libraries

External links 
 Codex Petropolitanus Purpureus N (022) at the Encyclopedia of Textual Criticism
 Codex Petropolitanus Purpureus at the  National Library of Russia, 2007

Petropolitanus Purpureus
Purple parchment
6th-century biblical manuscripts
National Library of Russia collection